World Policy Journal was the flagship publication of the World Policy Institute, published by Duke University Press. Focusing on international relations, the publication provided left-wing, non-United States-centric perspectives to world issues. It contained primarily policy essays but also book reviews, interviews, and historical essays. Most articles were commissioned. The last print issue of the journal was published in Winter 2017.

Criticism
In June 1991, authors Steven Emerson and Cristina del Sesto wrote that World Policy Journal is "a publication with a clear bias toward a pro-P.L.O. point of view", and that "In the entire history of that quarterly's publication, there has never been one analysis presenting the Israeli mainstream point of view." World Policy Institute senior fellow Eric Alterman characterized their critique as "wild aspersions".

Praise 
In a 2002 article, The New York Times described the magazine as "one of the voices of dissent in how the United States carries out the war on terror abroad", stating: "The World Policy Journal has little of the money or reach of Foreign Affairs, its august rival uptown. But it has a place. 'It is a thoughtful journal,' said James F. Hoge Jr., the editor of Foreign Affairs, which publishes articles by more mainstream political figures. 'It makes an effort to get views that may not find a home in more established publications like ours.'"

Notable articles and authors
In March 2000, the Congressional Research Service (CRS) ranked the journal as one of the top foreign policy publications in the United States, along with Foreign Affairs and Foreign Policy, because of the quality and expert opinion of pieces written on the US global role for the post-Cold War era. The CRS named nine influential articles that appeared in World Policy Journal, such as Sidney Blumenthal's analysis on "The Return of the Repressed Anti-Internationalism and the American Right", Paul Kennedy's "The Next American Century?", and articles by David Calleo, Hugh DeSantis, Christopher Layne, Charles William Maynes, William Pfaff, Joel H. Rosenthal and David Unger.

Material from the journal was sometimes republished as books, such as Ahmed Rashid's Jihad, Rajan Menon's End of Alliances, and Brian Steidle's The Devil Came on Horseback.

Editors
Former editors were Christopher Shay (2015–2016), Sherle R. Schwenninger (1982–1991), Richard Caplan (1991–1992), James Chace (1993–2000), Karl E. Meyer (2000–2008), and David A. Andelman (2008–2015).

Former managing editors included Yaffa Fredrick, Christopher Shay, Justin Vogt, Ryan Bradley, Linda Wrigley, and Benjamin Pauker.

Patrick Coleff, the Digital Access and Books Specialist for Duke University Press stated: "The owner of World Policy Journal, the World Policy Institute, is in a time of transition, and it was unclear when the journal will resume publication."

Abstracting and indexing
World Policy Journal is abstracted and indexed in Academic Search Elite, Academic Search Premier, Arts and Humanities Search, PubMed, Scopus, and the Social Sciences Citation Index.

Editorial board 
In 2016 the editorial board has the following members:
 Seymour Topping, Columbia University (Chairman)
 Sulaiman Al-Hattlan, HattPost Media
 Eric Alterman, World Policy Institute
 Sidney Blumenthal, Author
 Ying Chan, The University of Hong Kong
 Mark Danner, The New York Review of Books
 Kate Doyle, National Security Archive
 Naresh Fernandes, Scroll.in
 David Fromkin, Boston University
 John Maxwell Hamilton, Louisiana State University
 James F. Hoge Jr., Center for Global Affairs, NYU
 Aziz Z.Huq, University of Chicago Law School
 Azubuike lshiekwene, Punch Newspaper Group, Nigeria
 Peter B. Kaufman, Intelligent Television
 Paul Kelly, The Australian
 Anne Nelson, Columbia University
 Peter Osnos, PublicAffairs Books
 Jennifer Ramos, Loyola Marymount University
 Sherle R. Schwenninger, World Policy Institute
 Nancy E. Soderberg, Connect U.S. Fund
 Ronald Steel,  University of Southern California
 Paul Steiger, ProPublica
 Angela E. Stent, Georgetown University
 Patrick Wajsman, Politique Internationale
 Martin Walker, World Policy Institute
 Ruth Wedgwood, Johns Hopkins University, SAIS

References

External links
 

1983 establishments in the United States
2017 disestablishments in the United States
Quarterly magazines published in the United States
Defunct political magazines published in the United States
Duke University Press academic journals
Magazines established in 1983
Magazines disestablished in 2017
Magazines published in New York City